This is a list of episodes of In Bed with Medinner episodes in broadcast order, from broadcast series 1.

Programme one
 Production code: 9C24116
 First aired: 1992-11-20
 Running time: 29:42

Summary 
Offbeat London comic Bob Mills presents the first of two pilot programmes.  He has gathered together music, moments from films and television series, stories, and observations on life, and discusses them with a live studio audience who – together with viewers – have been invited round to his pad for the night.  

In the first programme Bob looks at the black hole that is afternoon television; unearths the moment when a contestant in Family Fortunes answered with the word "turkey" to all the questions (an incident also referred to in episode one, series one of the sitcom 15 Storeys High); and takes a look at life on a London council estate.  Along the way he reflects on what has happened to such old friends as the "Watney's Party Seven", "Aztec" chocolate bars, Clyde Best, and "Crimplene". 

Former punk favourites The Buzzcocks provide the live music with "What do I Get?" and "Ever Fallen in Love".

Credits 
Presenter - Bob Mills
Guest Artists - Lee Cornes, Race Davies, The Buzzcocks
Director - Mike Toppin
Producer - Jeff Pope
Researchers - Una Murphy, Rrob Katz
Assc. Producers - Brent Baker, Debbie Hyde
Production Secretary - Sarah Riches
Production Supervisor - Sue Hubble

Programme two 
 Production code: 9C24117
 First aired: 1992-11-27
 Running time: 29:56

Summary 
Offbeat London comic Bob Mills presents the second of two pilot programmes.  He has gathered together music, moments from films and television series, stories, and observations on life, and discusses them with a live studio audience who – together with viewers – have been invited around to his pad for the night.  

Includes music from Heatwave performing "My Girl" and "Boogie Nights".

Credits 
Presenter - Bob Mills
Guest Artists - Lee Cornes, Race Davies, Heatwave
Director - Mike Toppin
Producer - Jeff Pope
Researchers - Una Murphy, Rrob Katz
Assc. Producers - Brent Baker, Debbie Hyde
Production Secretary - Sarah Riches
Production Supervisor - Sue Hubble

1992 British television seasons